HaAh HaGadol 5 (lit. The Big Brother 5) is the fifth season of the Israeli version of the reality show Big Brother. The season began broadcasting on 5 May 2013, and ended on 27 August 2013. Eighteen housemates entered the house during the premiere, and another five housemates joined after sixty-six days. It is the first season to be broadcast in 16:9 widescreen format. It was also the longest-running Israeli season at the time, lasting 115 days, until it was surpassed by season 9 which ran for 120 days.

Housemates

Aharon
Aharon "Bijo" Tze'etzashvili, 37, Events Producer, Kiryat Haim

Anat
Anat Tzaig, 40, Hebrew Teacher, Tel Aviv

Avi
Avi "Led Zeppelin" Levy, 57, Plumber, Tiberias

Benny
Benny Goldstein, 36, Patents Inventor, Ashkelon

Dana
Dana Ran, 40, Bookkeeper, Kiryat Tiv'on

Danny
Danny Reichenthal, 46, Musician, Tel Aviv

Didi
Didi Luzon, 28, work in the cosmetics business, Rishon LeZion. Didi entered the house on Day 66.

Dor
Dor Damari, 23, Surfing Guide, Tel Aviv

Dorin
Dorin Sagol, 32, Fashion Designer, Holon

Gili
Gili Miley, 37, Graphic Artist, Petah Tikva. On day 57 he was Ejected from the show after insulting Anat, cursing her, and using homophobic utterances against her. Gili is the 2nd housemate that ejected from the fifth season. Roni, his father, was ejected earlier from the show, for similar reasons.

Itay
Itay Vallach, 26, Student, Tel Aviv. Itay entered the house on Day 66.

Karin
Karin Ben Galim, 23, Fashion Designer, Tel Aviv. chose to leave the house on day 6.

Leon
Leon Shwabsky, 27, Fashion Store Manager, Ramat Gan

Levana
Levana "Zoharim" Gogman, 29, Toy Store Manager, Tel Aviv

Miri
Miri Chen, 48, Talented Youth Events Producer, Haifa

Moti
Moti Glazer, 62, office manager, Tel Aviv. Moti entered the house on Day 66.

Or
Or Daniel, 24, Model, Beersheba. Or entered the house on Day 66.

Paulina
Paulina Alberstein, 28, Model, Tel Aviv

Roni
Roni Miley, 57, Graphic Artist, Pardes Katz, Bnei Brak. on day 16 he was Ejected from the show after expressing homophobic utterance during a heated conflict with lesbian housemate Levana. that is after being warned before for racist utterance towards Ethiopian housemate Tahounia. Ronnie became the 2nd housemate to be ejected from the house in the Israeli version (after Ma'ayan Khudeda in season 2).

Shelly
Shelly Varod, 35, Sexologist, Ramat HaSharon

Tahounia
Tahounia Rubel, 25, Model, Beit Shemesh. The winner of the fifth series.

Yaniv
Yaniv Avizratz, 33, Quality Control Engineer, Haifa

Yarden
Yarden Oz, 22, Bartender, Ramat Gan. Yarden entered the house on Day 66.

Nominations table

Notes

 As part of a secret mission, Big Brother divided the 16 housemates into pairs, except for Roni & Gili, who entered the house as a father/son pair. The secret mission was for the housemates to convince Roni & Gili of a couples' twist this year. After one week, Big Brother asked Roni & Gili to name the couples whom they thought were contriving a familial or romantic relationship, with every couple they correctly guessed automatically facing eviction. However, as they failed to realize that everyone was in a fake relationship, Roni and Gili also automatically faced eviction.
 As part of the "Survivor"-themed task, Big Brother split the house into two tribes. The losing tribe would go to Tribal Council and vote for one person to face the public vote. The tribe of Gili were the losers and named Gili for eviction. As Paulina won in the "Immunity challenge", she was immune from facing eviction this week. 
 There was no eviction in Week 4. However, Big Brother asked the housemates to nominate their favourite housemates. Avi was named favourite housemate after a tiebreaker vote between himself and Leon, and his reward was immunity from Week 5's eviction, which saw everyone else in the house bar Avi face the public vote.
 Didi, Itay, Moti, Or and Yarden, as new housemates, are exempt from the nominations process; that is, they cannot nominate nor be nominated. 
 Levana is automatically nominated during Week 11 for trying to coordinate nominations, and breaking the house rules because of that. 
 In Week 11, Dorin chose to nominate herself for eviction. Therefore, she automatically entered to the nomination list. 
 In Week 13, the housemate's love ones entered the house and chose the nomination list instead of the housemates. 
 Avi is automatically nominated during Week 15 for telling Dorin he nominated her for eviction (in week 14 nomination), and breaking the house rules because of that. 
 The housemates were asked to name one housemate who should get immunity from the final eviction. Levana & Leon received 2 votes each, and Itay was asked to choose between them who will get the immunity. He chose Levana, and she got the immunity.  
 There were no nominations in the final week and the public was voting for housemates to win, rather than be evicted. the housemate with the most SMS votes was the winner.

Nominations totals received

External links
  

2013 Israeli television seasons
05

he:האח הגדול (תוכנית טלוויזיה ישראלית)#עונה חמישית (2013)